Tony Mason may refer to:
Tony Mason (American football) (c. 1928–1994), American football coach
Tony Mason (co-driver), rally co-driver and presenter
Tony Mason (RAF officer) (born 1932), former British air marshal
Tony Mason, restaurateur best known for inventing the Lynchburg Lemonade

See also
Anthony Mason (disambiguation)